Silayev, also spelt Silaev and Silajev, may refer to:

 Aleksandr Silayev (1928–2005), a Soviet spring canoer
 Boris Silayev (born 1946), a Kyrgyz politician
 Ivan Silayev (1930–2023), a Soviet, and later, Russian politician
 Ivan Silayev (ice hockey) (born 1996), Russian ice hockey player

See also 
 Silayev's Government, Ivan Silayev's Soviet Cabinet